François Cluzet (born 21 September 1955) is a French film and theatre actor. Cluzet has collaborated with many important European and American directors, including Claude Chabrol, Bertrand Tavernier, Claire Denis, Agnieszka Holland, Robert Altman and Olivier Assayas. In 2007, he won a French César Award after starring as a doctor suspected of double homicide in thriller Tell No One (original title Ne le dis à personne). Cluzet may be best known for his role as Philippe in the international hit film The Intouchables (2011).

Career
Cluzet grew up in Paris, and made his stage debut in 1976. Three years later, he made his premiere appearance on the big screen in Cocktail Molotov with Diane Kurys. A year later, Cluzet appeared in acclaimed family drama Cheval d'orgueil directed by Claude Chabrol. The two reunited in 1982 for Les Fantômes du chapelier. In 1983, Cluzet acted in L'Été meurtrier with Jean Becker. He was nominated for a César Award for best supporting role of the year, in the same year he made a list for best new male for film Vive la sociale.

Cluzet next collaborated with a number of major name French directors, all of whom had a predilection towards dramatic works: reuniting with Kurys in 1983 for Coup de foudre, reuniting with Bertrand Tavernier (to co-star in jazz film Round Midnight in 1985), Tony Gatlif (Rue du départ, 1985), Claire Denis (Chocolat, 1987), Pierre Jolivet (Force majeure, 1988, and one new César nomination for best second male role), Bertrand Blier (Trop belle pour toi, 1989) and again Robert Enrico (La Révolution française). Next, the actor worked with Claude Chabrol to play a husband tortured by jealousy in L'Enfer (1994) after having filmed with Chabrol in 1988 for Une affaire de femmes.

In 1994, Cluzet tried international cinema, acting in ensemble movie Prêt-à-Porter for director Robert Altman and romance French Kiss with Lawrence Kasdan. He returned to French cinema and comedy in 1995 with Les Apprentis (César nomination for best actor) and Enfants de salaud with Tonie Marshall, following a new Claude Chabrol: Rien ne va plus in 1997. Cluzet has often portrayed a role of the tormented writer: Fin août, début septembre with Olivier Assayas, L'Examen de minuit (1998), and Je suis un assassin (2004). He played the double of John Lennon in Janis et John (2003) and an animator of teleshopping in France Boutique (2004). In 2005, he played in Le Domaine perdu with Raoul Ruiz. The film portrayed the 1973 coup d'état in Chile.

The year 2006 was big for Cluzet with his Quatre étoiles role of an over-the-hill F1 champion, touching and naive, paralysed with love for Isabelle Carré, but his starring role as a doctor suspected of double homicide in thriller Tell No One was seen by a wider international audience. For this role, he received the 2007 César for best actor.

Cluzet's biggest international hit to date is Intouchables (known in most English-speaking territories as The Intouchables). Based on a true story, the film chronicles the friendship between a wealthy quadraplegic (Cluzet) and a young caregiver who has been recently released from jail. In March 2012, The Intouchables became the highest-grossing non-English language film yet released (not accounting for inflation).

Personal life
Cluzet has a son, Paul (son of the late actress Marie Trintignant), as well as three other children: Blanche, Joseph, and Marguerite.

Filmography

Theatre
 1992: Belgicae by Anita Van Belle, directed by Pierre Pradinas, at the Festival d'Avignon

Awards
1984 : Nominated for César Award for Most Promising Actor for Vive la sociale
1984 : Nominated for César Award for Best Supporting Actor for One Deadly Summer
1984 : Prix Jean Gabin
1990 : Nominated for César Award for Best Supporting Actor for Force majeure
1996 : Nominated for César Award for Best Actor for Les Apprentis
2003 : Nominated for César Award for Best Supporting Actor for The Adversary
2007 : Nominated for César Award for Best Supporting Actor for Quatre étoiles
2007 : César Award for Best Actor for Tell No One
2007 : Nominated for Lumières Award for Best Actor for Tell No One
2007 : Étoile d'or du premier rôle masculin for Tell No One
2007 : Globes de Cristal Award for Best Actor for Tell No One
2010 : Nominated for César Award for Best Actor for One for the Road
2010 : Nominated for César Award for Best Actor for In the Beginning
2010 : Nominated for Lumières Award for Best Actor for In the Beginning
2010 : Nominated for Globes de Cristal Award for Best Actor for In the Beginning
2010 : Étoile d’Or for In the Beginning
2011 : Nominated for Globes de Cristal Award for Best Actor for Little White Lies
2012 : Nominated for César Award for Best Actor for The Intouchables
2012 : Nominated for Globes de Cristal Award for Best Actor for The Intouchables
2017 : Nominated for César Award for Best Actor for Irreplaceable

References

External links

 

1955 births
Living people
French male stage actors
French male film actors
Male actors from Paris
20th-century French male actors
21st-century French male actors
Best Actor César Award winners